Langenstein is a village and a former municipality in the district of Harz, in Saxony-Anhalt, Germany. Since 1 January 2010, it is part of the town Halberstadt. The World War II concentration camp Langenstein-Zwieberge was located here.

Former municipalities in Saxony-Anhalt
Halberstadt